Henry Gunthorp (29 April 1871 – 7 October 1962) was a New Zealand cricketer. He played first-class cricket for Canterbury and Otago between 1895 and 1903.

Gunthorp was born in London in 1871. Professionally he was a dentist.

References

External links
 

1871 births
1962 deaths
New Zealand cricketers
Canterbury cricketers
Otago cricketers
People from Marylebone
Cricketers from Greater London